Kainchak (Qayınsıq) is a rural locality (a village) in Kirzinsky Selsoviet, Karaidelsky District, Bashkortostan, Russia. The population was 1 as of 2010. There is 1 street.

Geography 
Kainchak is located 85 km south of Karaidel (the district's administrative centre) by road. Ur. Chulpan is the nearest rural locality.

References 

Rural localities in Karaidelsky District